Besleria is a genus of ca. 200 species of large herbs and soft-stemmed subshrubs or shrubs in the flowering plant family Gesneriaceae. They occur in Central America, South America, and the West Indies.

The closely related genus Gasteranthus was previously included in Besleria. The two genera have been separated on the basis of stomatal (aggregated in Gasteranthus, scattered in Besleria) and fruit (fleshy capsule in Gasteranthus, berry in Besleria) characters.

Selected species
 Besleria aggregata
 Besleria comosa
 Besleria elegans
 Besleria fasciculata
 Besleria formosa
 Besleria leucostoma
 Besleria lutea L.
 Besleria macahensis
 Besleria melancholica
 Besleria miniata
 Besleria modica
 Besleria notabilis
 Besleria princeps
 Besleria quadrangulata
 Besleria triflora

Footnotes

References
 Wiehler, Hans. "BESLERIA L. AND THE RE-ESTABLISHMENT OF GASTERANTHUS BENTH. (GESNERIACEAE)." Selbyana 1, no. 2 (1975): 150–56.

External links
Besleria from The Genera of Gesneriaceae

 
Gesneriaceae genera